Satanta is a city in Haskell County, Kansas, United States.  As of the 2020 census, the population of the city was 1,092.  Every year there is a celebration of Satanta's Indian heritage called Satanta Day.

History
The town is named after Kiowa Chief Satanta.

The first post office in Satanta was established in October 1912.

Geography
Satanta is located at  (37.436602, -100.987509).

Climate
According to the Köppen Climate Classification system, Satanta has a semi-arid climate, abbreviated "BSk" on climate maps.

Demographics

2010 census
As of the census of 2010, there were 1,133 people, 424 households, and 294 families residing in the city. The racial makeup of the city was 81.6% White, 0.8% African American, 0.7% Native American, 0.8% Asian, 12.8% from other races, and 3.3% from two or more races. Hispanic or Latino of any race were 35.1% of the population.

There were 424 households, of which 35.1% had children under the age of 18 living with them, 59.4% were married couples living together, 6.6% had a female householder with no husband present, 3.3% had a male householder with no wife present, and 30.7% were non-families. 27.4% of all households were made up of individuals, and 11.4% had someone living alone who was 65 years of age or older. The average household size was 2.60 and the average family size was 3.19.

The median age in the city was 37 years. 29% of residents were under the age of 18; 7% were between the ages of 18 and 24; 22.2% were from 25 to 44; 26.9% were from 45 to 64; and 14.7% were 65 years of age or older. The gender makeup of the city was 49.2% male and 50.8% female.

2000 census
As of the census of 2000, there were 1,239 people, 431 households, and 324 families residing in the city. The racial makeup of the city was 82.57% White, 0.40% African American, 0.65% Native American, 0.97% Asian, 12.91% from other races, and 2.50% from two or more races. Hispanic or Latino of any race were 29.94% of the population.

There were 431 households, out of which 40.4% had children under the age of 18 living with them, 66.4% were married couples living together, 7.0% had a female householder with no husband present, and 24.8% were non-families. 22.3% of all households were made up of individuals, and 8.8% had someone living alone who was 65 years of age or older. The average household size was 2.80 and the average family size was 3.33.

In the city, the population was spread out, with 31.3% under the age of 18, 7.4% from 18 to 24, 27.4% from 25 to 44, 20.6% from 45 to 64, and 13.2% who were 65 years of age or older. The median age was 34 years. For every 100 females, there were 100.2 males. For every 100 females age 18 and over, there were 95.2 males.

The median income for a household in the city was $35,139, and the median income for a family was $41,750. Males had a median income of $30,846 versus $19,875 for females. The per capita income for the city was $15,392. About 9.9% of families and 13.4% of the population were below the poverty line, including 12.5% of those under age 18 and 17.9% of those age 65 or over.

Education
Satanta is a part of USD 507.

The Satanta Indians won the Kansas State High School boys class B Track & Field championship in 1958.

Notable people
 Edward Brandt, Minnesota state legislator, was born in Satanta.
 Gary Spani, professional football player, Kansas City Chiefs, was born in Satanta.

References

Further reading

External links
 Satanta - Directory of Public Officials
 USD 507, local school district
 Satanta city map, KDOT

Cities in Kansas
Cities in Haskell County, Kansas